The 2004–05 Carolina Hurricanes season was cancelled due to the lockout of the players of the National Hockey League (NHL).

Schedule
The Hurricanes preseason and regular season schedules were announced on July 14, 2004.

|-
| 1 || September 25 || @ Tampa Bay Lightning
|-
| 2 || September 27 || @ Florida Panthers
|-
| 3 || September 28 || @ Tampa Bay Lightning
|-
| 4 || September 29 || @ Atlanta Thrashers
|-
| 5 || October 1 || Florida Panthers
|-
| 6 || October 3 || Atlanta Thrashers
|-
| 7 || October 8 || Washington Capitals
|-
| 8 || October 9 || @ Washington Capitals
|-

|-
| 1 || October 14 || Atlanta Thrashers
|-
| 2 || October 16 || @ New York Islanders
|-
| 3 || October 20 || @ Detroit Red Wings
|-
| 4 || October 21 || @ Philadelphia Flyers
|-
| 5 || October 26 || @ Montreal Canadiens
|-
| 6 || October 27 || Ottawa Senators
|-
| 7 || October 29 || Toronto Maple Leafs
|-
| 8 || October 31 || Chicago Blackhawks
|-
| 9 || November 4 || @ Tampa Bay Lightning
|-
| 10 || November 5 || Montreal Canadiens
|-
| 11 || November 7 || Minnesota Wild
|-
| 12 || November 10 || Dallas Stars
|-
| 13 || November 12 || Atlanta Thrashers
|-
| 14 || November 14 || Calgary Flames
|-
| 15 || November 17 || @ Buffalo Sabres
|-
| 16 || November 19 || @ Philadelphia Flyers
|-
| 17 || November 20 || Buffalo Sabres
|-
| 18 || November 24 || New York Rangers
|-
| 19 || November 27 || Tampa Bay Lightning
|-
| 20 || November 28 || Vancouver Canucks
|-
| 21 || December 1 || Boston Bruins
|-
| 22 || December 3 || Pittsburgh Penguins
|-
| 23 || December 4 || @ New York Islanders
|-
| 24 || December 8 || @ Anaheim Mighty Ducks
|-
| 25 || December 9 || @ Los Angeles Kings
|-
| 26 || December 11 || @ San Jose Sharks
|-
| 27 || December 15 || @ Atlanta Thrashers
|-
| 28 || December 17 || @ Florida Panthers
|-
| 29 || December 18 || Atlanta Thrashers
|-
| 30 || December 21 || New Jersey Devils
|-
| 31 || December 23 || Toronto Maple Leafs
|-
| 32 || December 26 || Florida Panthers
|-
| 33 || December 27 || @ Atlanta Thrashers
|-
| 34 || December 30 || @ Ottawa Senators
|-
| 35 || December 31 || New York Islanders
|-
| 36 || January 5 || @ Washington Capitals
|-
| 37 || January 7 || Columbus Blue Jackets
|-
| 38 || January 8 || @ Nashville Predators
|-
| 39 || January 11 || @ Montreal Canadiens
|-
| 40 || January 13 || @ Buffalo Sabres
|-
| 41 || January 14 || Philadelphia Flyers
|-
| 42 || January 17 || Washington Capitals
|-
| 43 || January 21 || Tampa Bay Lightning
|-
| 44 || January 22 || @ New Jersey Devils
|-
| 45 || January 24 || @ Toronto Maple Leafs
|-
| 46 || January 26 || @ Pittsburgh Penguins
|-
| 47 || January 28 || Ottawa Senators
|-
| 48 || January 29 || @ Florida Panthers
|-
| 49 || January 31 || Phoenix Coyotes
|-
| 50 || February 2 || @ Atlanta Thrashers
|-
| 51 || February 3 || @ St. Louis Blues
|-
| 52 || February 5 || @ Phoenix Coyotes
|-
| 53 || February 7 || @ Colorado Avalanche
|-
| 54 || February 9 || New York Islanders
|-
| 55 || February 10 || @ Ottawa Senators
|-
| 56 || February 15 || @ Toronto Maple Leafs
|-
| 57 || February 18 || Pittsburgh Penguins
|-
| 58 || February 19 || @ New Jersey Devils
|-
| 59 || February 21 || Tampa Bay Lightning
|-
| 60 || February 23 || Philadelphia Flyers
|-
| 61 || February 26 || @ Washington Capitals
|-
| 62 || February 27 || Washington Capitals
|-
| 63 || March 2 || @ New York Rangers
|-
| 64 || March 4 || @ Tampa Bay Lightning
|-
| 65 || March 6 || @ Dallas Stars
|-
| 66 || March 7 || Edmonton Oilers
|-
| 67 || March 10 || Colorado Avalanche
|-
| 68 || March 12 || Florida Panthers
|-
| 69 || March 15 || Washington Capitals
|-
| 70 || March 17 || Montreal Canadiens
|-
| 71 || March 19 || @ Boston Bruins
|-
| 72 || March 22 || @ New York Rangers
|-
| 73 || March 24 || Boston Bruins
|-
| 74 || March 26 || @ Pittsburgh Penguins
|-
| 75 || March 28 || @ Boston Bruins
|-
| 76 || March 29 || Buffalo Sabres
|-
| 77 || March 31 || New Jersey Devils
|-
| 78 || April 2 || New York Rangers
|-
| 79 || April 4 || @ Washington Capitals
|-
| 80 || April 6 || @ Tampa Bay Lightning
|-
| 81 || April 8 || @ Florida Panthers
|-
| 82 || April 10 || Florida Panthers
|-

Transactions
The Hurricanes were involved in the following transactions from June 8, 2004, the day after the deciding game of the 2004 Stanley Cup Finals, through February 16, 2005, the day the  season was officially cancelled.

Trades

Players acquired

Players lost

Signings

Draft picks
Carolina's picks at the 2004 NHL Entry Draft, which was hosted by the Hurricanes at the RBC Center in Raleigh, North Carolina on June 26–27, 2004.

Notes

References

Carol
Carol
Carolina Hurricanes seasons
Hurr
Hurr